Layn Raymond Phillips (born January 2, 1952) is a former United States district judge of the United States District Court for the Western District of Oklahoma. He currently conducts alternative dispute resolution, including mediation and arbitration.

Education and career

Born in Oklahoma City, Oklahoma, Phillips received dual Bachelor of Science and Bachelor of Arts degrees as an economics major from the University of Tulsa in 1974 and a Juris Doctor from the University of Tulsa College of Law in 1977. He competed in tennis for Tulsa. He was a trial attorney of the Bureau of Competition of the Federal Trade Commission in Washington, D.C. from 1977 to 1980. He was an Assistant United States Attorney of the Central District of California from 1980 to 1983. He was a Special Assistant United States Attorney in Miami, Florida from 1980 to 1981. He was the United States Attorney for the Northern District of Oklahoma from 1984 to 1987. He was an adjunct professor at the University of Tulsa from 1984 to 1987.

Federal judicial service

Phillips was nominated by President Ronald Reagan on February 2, 1987, to a seat on the United States District Court for the Western District of Oklahoma vacated by Judge Luther Boyd Eubanks. He was confirmed by the United States Senate on June 11, 1987, and received his commission on June 15, 1987. Phillips served in that capacity until his resignation on June 22, 1991.

Post judicial service

Phillips entered private practice in Newport Beach, California, serving as partner at Irell & Manella for 23 years. Following his departure from Irell & Manella, Phillips founded Phillips ADR, a dispute resolution firm. He currently serves as CEO of the firm, as well as an arbitrator and mediator at the firm.

Personal

Phillips currently resides in Laguna Beach, California with his wife, Kathryn. He has three grown children Amanda, Parker and Graham; a granddaughter, Stella Kathryn; and a grandson, Owen Layn.

References

Sources
 

1952 births
Living people
Assistant United States Attorneys
Judges of the United States District Court for the Western District of Oklahoma
United States Attorneys for the Northern District of Oklahoma
United States district court judges appointed by Ronald Reagan
20th-century American judges
University of Tulsa alumni
University of Tulsa College of Law faculty
University of Tulsa College of Law alumni
Tulsa Golden Hurricane men's tennis players